Eight ships of the Royal Navy have borne the name Renown, whilst three others have borne the name at various stages in their construction:

  was a 30-gun fifth rate, previously the French ship Renommée.
  was a 50-gun fourth rate launched in 1774 and broken up in 1794.
  was a 74-gun third rate launched in 1798. She had been built under the name HMS Royal Oak, but was renamed in 1796. She was on harbour service from 1814 and was broken up in 1835.
  was a 91-gun second rate launched in 1857 and sold to Prussia in 1870.
 HMS Renown was to have been a  but she was renamed  in 1890 and launched in 1891.
  was a unique battleship launched in 1895 and sold for scrap in 1914.
 HMS Renown was to have been a  but she was renamed  in 1913 and launched in 1915.
  was a  launched in 1916 and sold in 1948.
  was a  launched in 1967.  She was paid off in 1996 and is currently awaiting disposal.

Battle honours
Ships named Renown have earned the following battle honours:

Gabbard, 1653
Scheveningen, 1653
Ushant, 1782
Egypt, 1801
Norway, 1940
Spartivento, 1940
Atlantic, 1940
Bismarck, 1941
Mediterranean, 1941
Malta Convoys, 1941−42
Arctic, 1942
North Africa, 1942
Sabang, 1944
East Indies, 1944

See also 
 

Royal Navy ship names